Väli is an Estonian surname meaning "field" and an "outdoor, open space" in nature. As of 1 January 2021, 382 men and 422 women in Estonian have the surname Väli. Väli is ranked as the 107th most common surname for men in Estonia, and 104th for women.  The surname Väli is most common in Saare County, where 50.31 per 10,000 inhabitants of the county bear the surname.

Notable people bearing the Väli surname include:

Arder Väli (born 1945), politician 
Ekke Väli (born 1952), sculptor
Heino Väli (1928–1990), writer
Hugo Väli (1902–1943), footballer
Katrin Väli (born 1956), poet and translator
Neeme Väli (born 1965), Major General of the Estonian Defence League
Valdemar Väli (1909–2007), painter 
Velvo Väli (born 1974), actor
Voldemar Väli (1903–1997), two-time Olympic medalist in Greco-Roman wrestling

References

Estonian-language surnames